The National Renewable Energy Laboratory (NREL) in the US specializes in the research and development of renewable energy, energy efficiency, energy systems integration, and sustainable transportation. NREL is a federally funded research and development center sponsored by the Department of Energy and operated by the Alliance for Sustainable Energy, a joint venture between MRIGlobal and Battelle. Located in Golden, Colorado, NREL is home to the National Center for Photovoltaics, the National Bioenergy Center, and the National Wind Technology Center.

History 

The Solar Energy Research, Development and Demonstration Act of 1974 established the Solar Energy Research Institute, which opened in 1977 and was operated by MRIGlobal. Under the Jimmy Carter administration, its activities went beyond research and development in solar energy as it tried to popularize knowledge about already existing technologies, like passive solar. During the Ronald Reagan administration the institute's budget was cut by nearly 90%; many employees were "reduced in force" and the institute's activities were reduced to R&D. In September 1991, the institute was designated a national laboratory of the U.S. Department of Energy by President George H.W. Bush and its name was changed to the National Renewable Energy Laboratory.

Renewed interest in energy problems improved the laboratory's position, but funding has fluctuated over the years. In 2011, anticipated congressional budget shortfalls led to a voluntary buyout program for 100 to 150 staff reductions, and in 2015 budget cuts led to staff layoffs and further buyouts.

Dr. Martin Keller became NREL's ninth director in November 2015, and currently serves as both the director of the laboratory and the president of its operating contractor, Alliance for Sustainable Energy, LLC. He succeeded Dan Arvizu, who retired in September 2015 after 10 years in those roles.

Department of Energy funding 

In fiscal year 2020, congressional appropriations for the Department of Energy contained $464.3 million for NREL. This total included the following amounts for its renewable energy technology programs:

 Solar energy: $122.4 million
 Wind power: $30.0 million
 Bioenergy: $56.3 million
 Hydrogen and fuel cells: $17.6 million
 Geothermal: $1.8 million
 Water power: $15.8 million

Commercialization and technology transfer 

NREL works closely with a number of private partners to transfer technological developments in renewable energy and energy efficiency technologies to the marketplace and social arena.

NREL's technologies have been recognized with 61 R&D 100 Awards. The idea of technology transfer was added to the mission of NREL as a means of enhancing commercial impact and societal benefit, ultimately justifying the use of tax dollars to in part fund the projects in the lab.

As many of these technologies are young and often just emerging, NREL aims to reduce the risk of private sector investment and adoption of their developments. Three key pieces of federal legislation laid the policy framework to enact technology transfer: The Stevenson-Wydler Technology Innovation Act of 1980, The Bayh–Dole Act or The University and Small Business Patent Procedures Act of 1980, and The Federal Technology Transfer Act of 1986.

Ultimately, many of the deployed technologies help mitigate the oil dependence of the United States, reduce carbon emissions from fossil fuel use, and maintain U.S. industry competitiveness. Deployment of technologies is accomplished by developing technology partnerships with private industry. NREL serves as a reduced-risk platform for research, and through partnerships those advances can effectively be translated into serving the interest of both the private sector and the public sector. The energy goals set by the DOE are at the forefront of the research done in the laboratory, and the research reflects the energy goals, which are designed with the interest of "U.S. industry competitiveness" in mind. The challenge to achieving these goals is investment security.

Part of the technology transfer process is to form partnerships that not only focus on financial security, but also to consider partners who have demonstrated core values that reflect the integrity to manage the introduction and assimilation of the technological developments. NREL focuses on the core values of the partnering entity, the willingness to set and meet timely goals, dedication to transparency, and a reciprocating intent to further development. Under these partnership agreements, NREL does not fund projects conducted by their private partners. NREL does provide funding opportunities through their competitively placed contracts. In order to form a Technology Partnership Agreement with NREL, there are essentially seven steps:

 Discuss the project proposal with the appropriate NREL technical contact
 Determine if the project meets qualifications
 Develop statement of work
 Review and/or negotiate
 Sign agreement
 Send funds and start work
 Manage commitment

The process is estimated to require 45 business days, subject to negotiations. Technology Partnership Agreements provide only the technical services of NREL.

NREL also has a user access program that allows outside researchers to use the Energy Systems Integration Facility (ESIF) and rely on its staff of scientists and engineers to develop and evaluate energy technologies.

Several other ways exist for universities and industries to work with NREL, including a Cooperative Research and Development Agreement (CRADA), a Funds-In Agreement (FIA), and a Technical Services Agreement (TSA).

Cooperative Research and Development Agreement

A Cooperative Research and Development Agreement (CRADA) is a partnership between NREL and an outside company. This type of agreement protects the intellectual property of both NREL and the outside company, and allows the investing company to negotiate for an exclusive field-of-use license for any inventions that come out of the CRADA.

A CRADA between NREL and DuPont helped the chemical company develop two key technologies for processing cellulosic ethanol and lead to the opening of a 30 million gallon refinery in Iowa in 2015.

Strategic Partnership Projects Agreements 
NREL offers technical services to partners who require resources that are not available to them through the form of a Strategic Partnership Projects agreement, which formerly was known as a Work-for-Others agreement. This agreement differs from a CRADA in that they are not for the purpose of performing joint research. The partner covers the entire cost of the project. There are three types of Strategic Partnership Projects agreements:

 Interagency Agreement-Government: A partnership formed between the DOE and a second U.S. federal agency. The outside agency funds the project directly.
 Funds-In Agreement (FIA): A non-federal entity funds the project and research conducted by NREL. In some occasions, the partner can obtain title to inventions.
 Technical Services Agreement (TSA): A non-federal entity pays NREL for services related to an analytical problem. NREL provides consultation and basic technical assistance.

Technology licensing 

NREL offers licensing for many of its technologies related to energy efficiency and renewable energy development. Licensing of NREL's intellectual property is available to businesses of any size, from start-up to Fortune 500. The available technologies fall under the categories of: renewable electricity conversion and delivery systems, renewable fuels formulation and delivery, efficient and integrated energy systems, and strategic energy analysis. "NREL-developed technologies include vehicles and fuels, basic sciences, biomass, concentrating solar power, electric infrastructure systems, geothermal, hydrogen and fuel cells, photovoltaics, and wind energy."

NREL has a list of 150 market summaries available for licensing, and the list includes information about the descriptions of the technologies, their benefits, potential applications, and their current stage in development.

National Center for Photovoltaics 

The goals of the photovoltaics (PV) research done at NREL are to decrease the "nation's reliance on fossil-fuel generated electricity by lowering the cost of delivered electricity and improving the efficiency of PV modules and systems."

Photovoltaic research at NREL is performed under the National Center for Photovoltaics (NCPV). A primary mission of the NCPV is to support ongoing efforts of the DOE's SunShot Initiative, which wants to increase the availability of solar power at a cost competitive with other energy sources. The NCPV coordinates its research and goals with researchers from across the country, including the Quantum Energy and Sustainable Solar Technologies (QESST) Center and the Bay Area PV Consortium. The NCPV also partners with many universities and other industry partners. NREL brings in dozens of students annually through the Solar University-National lab Ultra-effective Program (SUN UP), which was created to facilitate existing and new interactions between universities and the laboratory.

The lab maintains a number of research partnerships for PV research.

Research and development

Some of the areas of PV R&D include the physical properties of PV panels, performance and reliability of PV, junction formation, and research into photo-electrochemical materials.

Through this research, NREL hopes to surpass current technologies in efficiency and cost-competitiveness and reach the overall goal of generating electricity at $0.06/kWh for grid-tied PV systems.

NREL identifies the following as cornerstones to its PV R&D program: the Thin-Film Partnership and the PV Manufacturing R&D Project.

The Thin Film Partnership Program at NREL coordinates national research teams of manufacturers, academics, and NREL scientists on a variety of subjects relating to thin-film PV. The research areas of the Thin Film Partnership Program include amorphous silicon (a-Si), copper indium diselenide (CuInSe2 or CIGS) and, cadmium telluride (CdTe), and module reliability.

NREL's PV Manufacturing Research and Development Project is an ongoing partnership between NREL and private sector solar manufacturing companies. It started in 1991 as the Photovoltaic Manufacturing Technology (PVMaT) project and was extended and renamed in 2001 due to its success as a project. The overall goal of research done under the PV Manufacturing R&D Project is to help maintain a strong market position for US solar companies by researching ways to reduce costs to manufacturers and customers and improving the manufacturing process. It is estimated that the project has helped to reduce manufacturing cost for PV panels by more than 50%.

Examples of achievements under the PV Manufacturing Research and Development Project include the development of a manufacturing process that increase the production of silicon solar modules by 8% without increasing costs and the development of a new boron coating process that reduces solar costs over traditional processes.

Testing

NREL is capable of providing testing and evaluation to the PV industry with indoor, outdoor, and field testing facilities. NREL is able to provide testing on long-term performance, reliability, and component failure for PV systems. NREL also has accelerated testing capabilities from both PV cells and system components to identify areas of potential long-term degradation and failure. The Photovoltaic Device Performance group at NREL is able to measure the performance of PV cells and modules with regard to a standard or customized reference set. This allows NREL to serve as independent facility for verifying device performance. NREL allows industry members to test and evaluate potential products, with the hope that it will lead to more cost effective and reliable technology. The overall goal is to help improve the reliability in the PV industry.

Deployment 

NREL also seeks to raise public awareness of PV technologies through its deployment services. NREL provides a number of technical and non-technical publications intended to help raise consumer awareness and understanding of solar PV. Scientists at NREL perform research into energy markets and how to develop the solar energy market. They also perform research and outreach in the area of building-integrated PV. NREL is also an active organizer and sponsor in the DOE's Solar Decathlon.

NREL provides information on solar energy, beyond the scientific papers on research done at the lab. The lab provides publications on solar resources and manuals on different applications of solar technology, as well as a number of different solar resource models and tools. The lab also makes available a number of different solar resource data sets in its Renewable Resource Data Center.

Facilities

NREL's Golden, Colorado campus houses several facilities dedicated to PV and biomass research.  In the recently opened Science and Technology Facility, research is conducted on solar cells, thin films, and nanostructure research.  NREL's Outdoor Test Facility allows researchers to test and evaluate PV technologies under a range of conditions, both indoor and outdoor.  Scientists at NREL work at the Outdoor Test Facility to develop standards for testing PV technologies.  At the Outdoor Test Facility NREL researchers calibrate primary reference cells for use in a range of applications.  One of the main buildings for PV research at NREL is the Solar Energy Research Facility (SERF).  Examples of research conducted at the SERF include semiconductor material research, prototype solar cell production, and measurement and characterization of solar cell and module performance. Additionally, the roof at the SERF is able to house ten PV panels to evaluate and analyze the performance of commercial building-integrated PV systems.  Additionally, R&D in PV materials and devices, measurement and characterization, reliability testing are also conducted at the SERF. At the Solar Radiation Research Laboratory, NREL has been measuring solar radiation and meteorological data since 1984.

National Bioenergy Center

The National Bioenergy Center (NBC) was established in October 2000. "The National Bioenergy Center is composed of four technical groups and a technical lead for partnership development with industry. Partnership development includes work performed at NREL under Cooperative Research and Development Agreements (CRADA), Technical Service Agreements (TSA), Analytical Service Agreements (ASA), and Work for Others (WFO) contract research for DOE's industry partners."

The main focus of the research is to convert biomass into biofuels/biochemical intermediates via both biochemical and thermochemical processes.

The National Bioenergy Center is currently divided into certain technology and research areas:
 Applied Science
 Catalysis and Thermochemical Sciences and Engineering R&D
 Biochemical Process R&D
 Biorefinery Analysis

Some of the current projects are in the following areas:
 Biomass characteristics
 Biochemical conversion
 Thermochemical conversion
 Chemical and catalyst science
 Integrated biorefinery processes
 Microalgal biofuels
 Biomass process and sustainability analysis

The Integrated Biorefinery Research Facility (IBRF) houses multiple pilot-scale process trains for converting biomass to various liquid fuels at a rate of 450–900 kg (0.5–1 ton) per day of dry biomass. Unit operations include feedstock washing and milling, pretreatment, enzymatic hydrolysis, fermentation, distillation, and solid-liquid separation.  The heart of the Thermochemical Users Facility (TCUF) is the 0.5-metric-ton-per-day Thermochemical Process Development Unit (TCPDU), which can be operated in either a pyrolysis or gasification mode.

National Wind Technology Center 

NREL has produced many technologies that impact the wind industry at a global level. The National Wind Technology Center (NWTC) is home of 20 patents and has created software such as (FAST), simulation software that is used to model wind turbines.

The NWTC is located on NREL's Flatirons Campus, which is at the base of the foothills just south of Boulder, Colorado. The campus comprises field test sites, test laboratories, industrial high-bay work areas, machine shops, electronics and instrumentation laboratories, and office areas.

The NWTC is also home to NREL's Distributed Energy Resources Test Facility (DERTF). The DERTF is a working laboratory for interconnection and systems integration testing. This facility includes generation, storage, and interconnection technologies as well as electric power system equipment capable of simulating a real-world electric system.

The center is the first facility in the United States with a controllable grid interface test system that has fault simulation capabilities and allows manufacturers and system operators to conduct the tests required for certification in a controlled laboratory environment. It is the only system in the world that is fully integrated with two dynamometers and has the capacity to extend that integration to turbines in the field and to a matrix of electronic and mechanical storage devices, all of which are located within close proximity on the same site.

Transportation and hydrogen systems research 
As the only national laboratory dedicated 100% to renewable energy and energy efficiency, NREL collaborates with industry, government, and research partners to create better:
 Electric, hybrid, fuel cell, and conventional vehicle technologies
 Biofuels, hydrogen, natural gas, propane, and petroleum-based fuels
 Charging and fueling infrastructure.

Transportation research areas 
 Commercial vehicle technologies
 Electric vehicle grid integration
 Energy storage
 Fuels performance
 Power electronics and electric machines
 Sustainable Mobility Initiative
 Systems analysis and integration
 Vehicle thermal management

See also 
 List of renewable energy organizations
 Renewable energy
 Renewable energy commercialization in the United States
 Simple Model of the Atmospheric Radiative Transfer of Sunshine (SMARTS), software published by NREL

Notes

References

Further reading

External links 

Energy research institutes
Renewable energy organizations based in the United States
United States Department of Energy national laboratories
Federally Funded Research and Development Centers
Buildings and structures in Golden, Colorado
Research institutes in Colorado
Battelle Memorial Institute
Golden, Colorado
1974 establishments in Colorado